Liu Wei is a retired Chinese basketball player who played as a point guard.

CBA career
Liu Wei played alongside his close friend Yao Ming for ten years on several youth teams and with the Shanghai Sharks before Yao went on to play in the National Basketball Association with the Houston Rockets. Prior to the 2004-05 season, the Sacramento Kings signed Liu to their preseason roster. Liu was released by Sacramento at the end of training camp after playing in three games and averaging two points per game and four rebounds per game. Liu then returned to China to play for the Shanghai Sharks, carving out a career as one of the best ever players in the Chinese Basketball Association. After seventeen seasons playing for Shanghai, Liu decided to sign with the Xinjiang Flying Tigers.

National team career
Liu was a key member of the Chinese national basketball team that participated in the 2002 FIBA World Championship, the 2006 FIBA World Championship, and the 2010 FIBA World Championship. He was also selected to play on the Chinese national squads that competed at the 2004 Summer Olympics, the 2008 Summer Olympics and the 2012 Summer Olympics. In addition, Liu has also taken part in numerous FIBA Asia Cup competitions.

Career statistics

CBA statistics

References

External links
FIBA Profile
Profile at Eurobasket.com
Fourteen Years And Counting; The Legacy Of Liu Wei In Shanghai

1980 births
Living people
Basketball players from Shanghai
Point guards
Shanghai Sharks players
Sichuan Blue Whales players
Shooting guards
Xinjiang Flying Tigers players
Chinese men's basketball players
Olympic basketball players of China
Basketball players at the 2004 Summer Olympics
Basketball players at the 2008 Summer Olympics
Basketball players at the 2012 Summer Olympics
Asian Games medalists in basketball
Asian Games gold medalists for China
Asian Games silver medalists for China
Basketball players at the 2002 Asian Games
Basketball players at the 2006 Asian Games
Basketball players at the 2010 Asian Games
Medalists at the 2002 Asian Games
Medalists at the 2006 Asian Games
Medalists at the 2010 Asian Games
2010 FIBA World Championship players
2006 FIBA World Championship players
2002 FIBA World Championship players